Damjan Rudež (born 17 June 1986) is a Croatian former professional basketball player. He represented the Croatian national team.

Professional career

Europe
From 2002 to 2004, Rudež played for the junior team of Zrinjevac and occasionally for the senior team. From 2004 to 2006, he played for the Belgian club Oostende, where he won his first championship in 2006. From 2006 to 2008, he played for Split.

In June 2008, he signed a two-year deal with Union Olimpija. In 2009, he left Olimpija and signed with Cedevita Zagreb.

On 7 July 2011, he signed a one-year deal with Cibona Zagreb.

In August 2012, he signed a one-year deal with CAI Zaragoza of Spain. On 26 June 2013, he re-signed with Zaragoza on a two-year deal. In June 2014, he requested a buy-out from his contract with Zaragoza.

NBA
On 11 July 2014, Rudež signed a three-year deal with the Indiana Pacers. During 2014–15 NBA season, Rudež led all rookies in three-point field goal percentage.

On 12 July 2015, Rudež was traded to the Minnesota Timberwolves in exchange for Chase Budinger. On 27 June 2016, the Timberwolves declined the $1.2 million team option on Rudež's contract for the 2016–17 season, making him an unrestricted free agent.

On 8 September 2016, Rudež signed with the Orlando Magic. On 7 September 2017, he re-signed with the Magic. On 13 October 2017, he was waived by the Magic.

Return to Europe
On 26 October 2017, Rudež signed a three-month contract with Spanish club Valencia Basket. Following the expiration of his contract, on 29 January 2018, he parted ways with Valencia. On 16 July 2018, Rudež signed a one-year contract with Spanish club UCAM Murcia.
Eventough he had several offers, Rudež made the choice to stay home during the 2019–2020 season to take care of his baby. He planned to return in March, April or May, but the coronavirus made a return impossible.

On 27 June 2020, Rudež signed with Donar in the Netherlands. His brother Ivan had signed before as head coach. He averaged 7.9 points, 4 rebounds and 3 assiststs in the Dutch Basketball League.

In November, 2021, Rudež announced his retirement from playing basketball and his intention to remain professionally in the sport.

NBA career statistics

Regular season

|-
| align="left" | 
| align="left" | Indiana
| 68 || 2 || 15.4 || .452 || .406 || .696 || .7 || .8 || .2 || .1 || 4.8
|-
| align="left" | 
| align="left" | Minnesota
| 33 || 0 || 8.4 || .403 || .340 || 1.000 || .6 || .3 || .1 || .0 || 2.3
|-
| align="left" | 
| align="left" | Orlando
| 45 || 0 || 7.0 || .352 || .313 || .000 || .6 || .4 || .3 || .0 || 1.8
|-
|-class="sortbottom"
| style="text-align:center;" colspan="2"| Career
| 146 || 2 || 11.2 || .424 || .373 || .774 || .6 || .6 || .2 || .0 || 3.3

National team career
On 3 August 2008, he was called into the senior Croatian national basketball team to compete at the 2008 Summer Olympics, after Damir Markota withdrew from the team, due to injury.

In 2009, he won the gold medal at the XVI Mediterranean Games, which were held in Pescara, Italy. He also represented Croatia at the EuroBasket 2015, where they were eliminated in the eighth-finals by the Czech Republic.

Honours

Club
Oostende
 Belgian League: 2005–06
Union Olimpija
 Slovenian Premier A: 2008–09
 Slovenian Cup: 2009
Cibona
 A-1 Liga: 2011–12

International
Croatia
Mediterranean Games:  2009

Individual
 A-1 Liga All-Star: 2007, 2008, 2010

Personal life
His older brother Ivan Rudež is a professional basketball coach for Donar in the Netherlands.

References

External links

 Damjan Rudež at Euroleague.net

1986 births
Living people
2014 FIBA Basketball World Cup players
ABA League players
AS Monaco Basket players
Basketball players at the 2008 Summer Olympics
Basketball players from Zagreb
Basket Zaragoza players
BC Oostende players
CB Murcia players
Competitors at the 2009 Mediterranean Games
Croatian expatriate basketball people in France
Croatian expatriate basketball people in Spain
Croatian expatriate basketball people in the United States
Croatian men's basketball players
Indiana Pacers players
KK Cedevita players
Donar (basketball club) players
Dutch Basketball League players
KK Cibona players
KK Olimpija players
KK Split players
KK Zrinjevac players
Liga ACB players
Mediterranean Games gold medalists for Croatia
Mediterranean Games medalists in basketball
Minnesota Timberwolves players
National Basketball Association players from Croatia
Olympic basketball players of Croatia
Orlando Magic players
Power forwards (basketball)
Undrafted National Basketball Association players
Valencia Basket players